The 35th Utah State Legislature was elected Tuesday, November 6, 1962, and convened on Monday, January 14, 1963.

Election of 1962

Prior to the 1962 election which brought Republicans to power, Utah Democrats controlled one U.S. Senate seat, both U.S. House districts, the Utah Senate (14-11), the Utah House (36-28) and controlled the majority of County Offices (146-117). After the election, the balance of power shifted to Utah Republicans who controlled the State Senate (13-12), State House (33-31), both Congressional Seats, and one Senate Seat along with the majority of County Offices (133-130). Republicans also elected a Republican as Utah's Attorney General. Democrat Frank Moss was elected to the U.S. Senate in 1958 and served until 1976, being defeated in the 1976 election by current U.S. Senate  Orrin Hatch (as of 2006) thus dividing the Utah Senate delegation between the Democratic and Republican parties.

Utah State Senate

Committees

See List of 35th Utah State Legislature Committees

Make-up

Members

Utah State House of Representatives

Committees

See List of 35th Utah State Legislature Committees

Make-up

Members

See also
 Utah State Legislature
 Office of the Governor
 List of Utah State Legislatures

References

Legislature
35
1963 in Utah
1964 in Utah
1963 U.S. legislative sessions
1964 U.S. legislative sessions